Macka could be a variant spelling of:

 Maçka, a town in Turkey.
 Maçka, İstanbul, a neighborhood in Istanbul
 Mačka, acrobatic glider that was produced in Yugoslavia.